The Strip is the story of corporate lawyer Melissa Walker, who decides her life needs a new direction and quits her job after finding her husband in bed with his male lover. She opens a male strip club, catering especially for women.  The series aired in New Zealand from 2002 to 2003 and has been syndicated in the United States on Vibrant TV Network.

Cast and characters
 Luanne Gordon as Melissa Walker, owner/manager of "Man Alive", mother to Paige
 Jodie Rimmer as Kathryn Moore, another corporate lawyer and Mel's best friend
 Renée Ellwood as Paige Walker, Melissa's teen tearaway daughter
 Robbie Magasiva as Adam Lima, the sexy head stripper at Mel's club
 David Fane as Jack Sione, the barman at Mel's club
 Susana Lei'ataua as Samara Sione, Jack's cousin, choreographer at "Man Alive" 
 Stephen Bain as Glenn Walker, Paige's father, Mel's soon-to-be ex-husband
 Stephen Lovatt as Det. Shane Robertson, a cop who Mel gets involved with 
 Janice Finn as Leslie Lonsdale, Mel's slightly crazy mother
 Eddie Campbell as Vince Cleaver, manager of the neighbouring Gates of Heaven men's strip club
 Michelle Langstone as Tre, somewhat eccentric choreographer at "Man Alive" 

The Strippers
 Taika Cohen as Mostin
 Craig Hall as Clint
 Mark Sant as Ian
 Dion Murphy as Daniel
 Stephen Handisides as Billy
 Kelson Henderson as Cal
 Mike Edward as Finn
 Boyd Bishop as Richard

Other regulars
 Loren Horsley as Danielle, a stripper at "Gates of Heaven"
 Nicole Whippy as Chocolate, a stripper at "Gates of Heaven"
 Brian Sergent as Ian "Dogwood" Douglas, Mel's boss at the law firm
 Jess Peters as Cherie, co-worker of Mel & Kathryn
 Sally Martin as Gemma, co-worker of Mel & Kathryn
 Dan Caddy as Josh, Paige's boyfriend
 Jeff Whiting as Mick, landlord of the premises, who Mel hooks up with in Season 2

External links
 

2000s New Zealand television series
2002 New Zealand television series debuts
2003 New Zealand television series endings
English-language television shows
New Zealand comedy-drama television series
Television shows filmed in New Zealand
Television shows funded by NZ on Air
Television shows set in Wellington
Three (TV channel) original programming